Cathedral schools began in the Early Middle Ages as centers of advanced education, some of them ultimately evolving into medieval universities. Throughout the Middle Ages and beyond, they were complemented by the monastic schools. Some of these early cathedral schools, and more recent foundations, continued into modern times.

Early schools

In the later Roman Empire, as Roman municipal education declined, bishops began to establish schools associated with their cathedrals to provide the church with an educated clergy. The earliest evidence of a school established in this manner is in Visigothic Spain at the Second Council of Toledo in 527. These early schools, with a focus on an apprenticeship in religious learning under a scholarly bishop, have been identified in other parts of Spain and about twenty towns in Gaul (France) during the sixth and seventh centuries.

During and after the mission of St Augustine to England, cathedral schools were established as the new dioceses were themselves created (Canterbury 597, Rochester 604, York 627 for example).  This group of schools forms the oldest schools continuously operating.  A significant function of cathedral schools was to provide boy trebles for the choirs, evolving into choir schools, some of which still function as such.

Charlemagne, king of the Franks and later Emperor, recognizing the importance of education to the clergy and, to a lesser extent, to the nobility, set out to restore this declining tradition by issuing several decrees requiring that education be provided at monasteries and cathedrals.  In 789, Charlemagne's Admonitio Generalis required that schools be established in every monastery and bishopric, in which "children can learn to read; that psalms, notation, chant, computation, and grammar be taught."  Subsequent documents, such as the letter De litteris colendis, required that bishops select as teachers men who had "the will and the ability to learn and a desire to instruct others" and a decree of the Council of Frankfurt (794) recommended that bishops undertake the instruction of their clergy.

Subsequently, cathedral schools arose in major cities such as Chartres, Orleans, Paris, Laon, Reims or Rouen in France and Utrecht, Liege, Cologne, Metz, Speyer, Würzburg, Bamberg, Magdeburg, Hildesheim or Freising in Germany.  Following in the earlier tradition, these cathedral schools primarily taught future clergy and provided literate administrators for the increasingly elaborate courts of the Renaissance of the 12th century. Speyer was renowned for supplying the Holy Roman Empire with diplomats. The court of Henry I of England, himself an early example of a literate king, was closely tied to the cathedral school of Laon.

Characteristics and development

Cathedral schools were mostly oriented around the academic welfare of the nobility's children. Because it was intended to train them for careers in the church, girls were excluded from the schools. Later on, many lay students who were not necessarily interested in seeking a career in the church wanted to enroll. The demand arose for schools to teach government, state, and other Church affairs. The schools, (some notable ones dating back to the eighth and ninth centuries) accepted fewer than 100 students. Pupils had to demonstrate substantial intelligence and be able to handle a demanding academic course load. Considering that books were also expensive, students were in the practice of memorizing their teachers' lectures. Cathedral schools at this time were primarily run by a group of ministers and divided into two parts: Schola minor, which was intended for younger students, would later become elementary schools. Then there was the schola major, which taught older students. These would later become secondary schools.

The subjects taught at cathedral schools ranged from literature to mathematics. These topics were called the seven liberal arts: grammar, astronomy, rhetoric (or speech), logic, arithmetic, geometry and music. In grammar classes, students were trained to read, write and speak Latin which was the universal language in Europe at the time. Astronomy was necessary for calculating dates and times. Rhetoric was a major component of a vocal education. Logic consisted of the criteria for sound or fallacious arguments, particularly in a theological context, and arithmetic served as the basis for quantitative reasoning. Students read stories and poems in Latin by authors such as Cicero and Virgil. Much as in the present day, cathedral schools were split into elementary and higher schools with different curricula. The elementary school curriculum was composed of reading, writing and psalmody, while the high school curriculum was trivium (grammar, rhetoric and dialect), the rest of the liberal arts, as well as scripture study and pastoral theology.

Cathedral schools today 
While cathedral schools are no longer a significant site of higher education, many Roman Catholic, Anglican, and Lutheran cathedrals operate as primary or secondary schools. Most of those listed below are modern foundations, but a few traces their history to medieval schools.

Australia
Bathurst – Cathedral Primary School
Bunbury – Bunbury Cathedral Grammar School
Perth – St George's Anglican Grammar School
Rockhampton – The Cathedral College
Sydney – St Andrew's Cathedral School
Sydney – St Mary's Cathedral College
Townsville – The Cathedral School of St Anne and St James
Wangaratta – Cathedral College

Canada
Hamilton – Christ the King
Toronto – St. Michael's Choir School

Denmark
Ribe – Ribe Katedralskole
Aarhus – Aarhus Katedralskole
Aalborg – Aalborg Katedralskole
Viborg – Viborg Katedralskole
Odense – Odense Katedralskole
Roskilde – Roskilde Katedralskole
Haderslev – Haderslev Katedralskole

Finland
Turku – Katedralskolan i Åbo

France
Paris – École cathédrale de Paris

Guatemala
 Colegio San José de los Infantes (founded in 1781)

India

Bangalore - Cathedral High School, Bangalore
Lucknow - Cathedral Senior Secondary School, Hazratganj, Lucknow
Mumbai - Cathedral and John Connon School, Fort, Mumbai

The Netherlands
 Koorschool St Bavo, Haarlem
 Kathedrale Koorschool Utrecht

Norway
 Bergen katedralskole
 Hamar katedralskole
 Kristiansand katedralskole
 Oslo katedralskole
 Stavanger katedralskole
 Trondheim katedralskole

Pakistan
Punjab, Pakistan – Cathedral High School

South Africa
Cape Town – St. George's Grammar School
Kimberley – St Cyprian's Grammar School

Sweden
Linköping – Katedralskolan
Lund – Katedralskolan
Skara – Katedralskolan
Uppsala – Katedralskolan
Växjö – Katedralskolan

United Kingdom

England
 The seven King's Schools established, or re-endowed and renamed, by King Henry VIII in 1541, are located in Canterbury, Chester, Ely, Gloucester, Peterborough, Rochester and Worcester
 London – St Paul's Cathedral School (Anglican), Westminster Abbey Choir School (Anglican), Westminster Cathedral Choir School (Roman Catholic)
 Bristol – Bristol Cathedral Choir School (a former cathedral school, it is now an academy)
 Chelmsford
 Chichester – The Prebendal School
 Durham – Chorister School
 Exeter – Exeter Cathedral School
 Hereford – Hereford Cathedral School
 Lichfield – Lichfield Cathedral School
 Lincoln, England - Lincoln Minster School
 Oxford – Christ Church Cathedral School
 Salisbury – Salisbury Cathedral School
 Southwell – The Minster School, Southwell
 Wells – Wells Cathedral School
 Winchester – The Pilgrims' School
 York – The Minster School, York

Wales
 The Cathedral School, Llandaff
 St John's College, Cardiff (the United Kingdom's only Roman Catholic cathedral school which teaches up to Sixth Form)

United States
Among others:
Arlington, Virginia – St. Thomas More Cathedral School
Boston, Massachusetts – Cathedral High School
Charlotte Amalie, Saint Thomas, U.S. Virgin Islands – All Saints Cathedral School
Kalamazoo, Michigan – St. Augustine Cathedral School
New York, New York – The Cathedral School, on the  Upper East Side
New York, New York – The Cathedral School of St. John the Divine
Salt Lake City, Utah – St. Vincent DePaul Parish School
Raleigh, North Carolina – Sacred Heart Cathedral School
Washington D.C. – National Cathedral School (girls) / St. Albans School (Washington, D.C.) (boys) / Beauvoir School (elementary)
Natchez, Mississippi - Cathedral Greenwave

See also 
List of choir schools
Monastic school
Carolingian Schools
School of Chartres
School of Reims

References

Sources

External links 

 
 
 

 
Medieval European education
Education in the United Kingdom
Private schools in the United Kingdom
School types